Ussuria is a genus of Lower Triassic ammonites with a smooth, involute discoidal shell with submonophyllic sutures,  belonging to the ceratitid family Ussuriidae.

Ussuria has been found in Russia in Siberia (original discovery), China, Oman, and Idaho in the United States.

Description
The shell of Ussuria is laterally compressed and involute. Whorls are deeply embracing, increasing rapidly in height. Umbilicus is narrow and deep with rounded shoulders. Sides gently convex, converging on a narrow rounded venter.

Sutures are ammonitic, with digitate lobes and submonophyllic saddles. The external,(or ventral), lobe is divided by a broad digitate siphonal saddle with each side of the lobe deeply trifid. The two or three  principal lateral lobes on either side that are wide and deeply digitate, followed dorsally by another three or more smaller, also digitate, auxiliary lobes. The first lateral saddle is typically indented only on the ventral (rim) side and the second lateral saddle only of the dorsal side.

Ussuria somewhat resembles Sturia, commonly  placed in the Ptychitidae. The early growth stages of Ussuria are like Dimorphoceras, the intermediate growth stage like Thalassoceras.

Taxonomy
Hyatt classified Ussuria in the Ussuriidae, based on Siberian forms, which is followed by W.J. Akell, et al., in the American Treatise part L, 1957. Related genera include Metussuria, Oxyussuria, and Parussuria.

Other classifications place Ussuriidae, including Ussuria, in the Meekocerataceae, an alternative for the Noritaceae.

References
W.J. Arkell et al.,1957. Mesozoic Ammonoidea.  Treatise on Invertebrate Paleontology, Part L. Geological Soc of America. Geological Society of America and University of Kansas Press. 
 James Perrin Smith, 1932. Lower Triassic Ammonoids of North America, US Geological Survey, Professional Paper 167. 
 Paleobiology Database-Ussuria

Noritoidea
Triassic ammonites
Ceratitida genera
Triassic animals of Asia